Visage is the debut studio album by the British new wave band Visage. It was recorded at Genetic Sound Studios in Reading, Berkshire and released in November 1980 by Polydor Records.

Release 
Visage was released in November 1980. It reached No. 13 in the UK and was certified Silver by the British Phonographic Industry in March 1981. "Fade to Grey" was released as a single and became a hit, reaching No. 8 on the UK Singles Chart and Top 10 positions in Europe, including No. 1 in Germany and Switzerland. Further singles, "Mind of a Toy" and the title track "Visage" were also UK Top 30 hits. The album was reissued as an expanded CD edition remastered from the original master tapes by Rubellan Remasters in the US in 2018.

Reception 

Aaron Krehbie of Digital Audio commented that "Moon over Moscow" and "Blocks on Blocks" are "perfect examples of Visage at its best". However, Krehbie also opined that the album was not "the group's best effort", preferring the group's next album, The Anvil.

In his retrospective review, Dan LeRoy of AllMusic wrote "this is the music that best represents the short-lived but always underrated new romantic movement", calling it "a consistently fine creation".

Track listing

Personnel 

 Visage

 Steve Strange – lead vocals
 Midge Ure – guitar, backing vocals, synthesizers
 John McGeoch – guitar, backing vocals, saxophone
 Dave Formula – synthesizer
 Billy Currie – electric violin, synthesizer
 Rusty Egan – drums, backing vocals, electronic percussion

 Additional personnel

 Barry Adamson – bass guitar (1, 2, 4)
 Chris Payne – synthesizer (5)
 Cedric Sharpley – drums, electronic drums programming (5)
 Brigitte Arens – voice (5)

 Technical

 John Hudson – recording, engineering, mixing
 Iain Gillies —  sleeve artwork, a blue/grey tinted monochrome original painting, (based on a b/w photograph by Peter Ashworth)
 Peter Ashworth – original sleeve photography (redrawn for publication)
 Martin Rushent - Co Production and mixing

Charts

Weekly charts

Year-end charts

Certifications

References

External links 

 

1980 debut albums
Albums produced by Midge Ure
Polydor Records albums
Visage (band) albums